Monika is a female name in German, Scandinavian, Czech, Slovak, Polish, Slovene, Croatian, Estonian, Lithuanian, Latvian and Hungarian (Mónika) which can also be seen in India. It is a variation of Monica, stemming from the word "advisor" in Latin and "unique" in Greek. Monika is also the patron saint of women and mothers.

Notable people
Monika Bolly (born 1968), Polish actress
Monika Christodoulou (born 1985), Greek singer-songwriter, known mononymously as Monika
Monika Czinano (born 2000), American basketball player
Monika Larsen Dennis (born 1963), Swedish sculptor
Monika Fagerholm, Finnish author
Monika Fikerle (born 1974), Australian musician
Monika Frimmer (born 1955), German soprano in opera and concert
Monika Griefahn (born 1954), German politician 
Monika Harms (born 1946), German lawyer
Monika Haukanõmm (born 1972), Estonian politician
Monika Ivkic (born 1989), Bosnian-Austrian singer
Monika Kuszyńska (born 1980), Polish singer
Monika Linkytė (born 1992), Lithuanian singer
Monika Mann (1910–1992), German novelist
Monika Panayotova (born 1983), Bulgarian politician
Monika Pflug (born 1954), German speed skater 
Monika Pyrek (born 1980), Polish pole vaulter
Monika Rhein, German oceanographer
Monika Rost (born 1943), German guitar and lute player
Monika Ryniak (born 1960), Polish politician
Monika Schnarre (born 1971), Canadian model and host
Monika Soćko (born 1978), Polish chess player
Countess Monika zu Solms-Laubach (1929–2015), German aristocrat
Monika Tsõganova (born 1969), Estonian chess player
Monika Wagner (born 1965), German curler
Monika Weber-Koszto (born 1966), Romanian and German fencer
Monika Wejnert (born 1992), Australian tennis player
Monika Zguro (born 1971), Miss Albania 1993
Monika Liu (born 1988), Lithuanian singer

Fictional characters
 Monika Kaniyashiki, police officer in the anime My Hero Academia
 Monika, club president in the visual novel Doki Doki Literature Club!

See also
Monica (given name)
Monique

References

German feminine given names
Polish feminine given names
Scandinavian feminine given names
Czech feminine given names
Croatian feminine given names
Slovak feminine given names
Estonian feminine given names
Lithuanian feminine given names
Latvian feminine given names
Swiss feminine given names
Swedish feminine given names
Norwegian feminine given names
Icelandic feminine given names
Finnish feminine given names
Danish feminine given names
Bulgarian feminine given names
Albanian feminine given names